The Moxotó River is a tributary of the São Francisco River in northeastern Brazil. The Moxotó originates on the Borborema Plateau in Pernambuco state, and flows southwest to join the São Francisco. The lower portion of the river forms the border between Pernambuco state to the west and Alagoas state to the east.

See also
List of rivers of Alagoas
List of rivers of Pernambuco

References

Rivers of Alagoas
Rivers of Pernambuco